Maciej Orlik (born 6 April 1938) is a Polish sports shooter. He competed in the men's 25 metre rapid fire pistol event at the 1976 Summer Olympics.

References

1938 births
Living people
Polish male sport shooters
Olympic shooters of Poland
Shooters at the 1976 Summer Olympics
People from Lublin Voivodeship